Kinney Shoe Corp v. Polan, 939 F.2d 209 (4th Cir. 1991), is a US corporate law case, concerning piercing the corporate veil.

Facts
Kinney Shoe Corp sued Mr Lincoln M Polan to pay money outstanding on a sub-lease by the "Industrial Realty Company". Polan wholly owned "Industrial", but had never held any corporate meetings or elected officers.

The question is whether Kinney could pursue Mr Polan for the debt.

Judgment
Chapman J quoted from Sanders v Roselawn Memorial Gardens, Inc. that the "fiction" of separate legal personality,

It emphasized that each case should be decided on its facts, and pointed to a number of relevant factors.

that Industrial was not adequately capitalized (no capital had been paid in)
no corporate formalities, such as taking minutes or electing officers, had been observed
it appeared that the company was deliberately used to carry out transactions to benefit another of Mr Polan's companies, which had assets but would be shielded from liability

He concluded by saying,

See also
United States corporate law
Texas Industries Industries Inc v DuPuy, 227 So. 2d 265 (La. Ct. App. 1969) "Inadequate capitalization is not of itself a badge of fraud... The general rule is that an individual may incorporate his business for the sole purpose of escaping individual liability for the corporate debts."

References

External links
 

United States corporate case law
United States Court of Appeals for the Fourth Circuit cases
1991 in United States case law